Col Collon (el. 3074 m.) is a high mountain pass across the central Pennine Alps, connecting Arolla in the Swiss canton of Valais to Bionaz in the Italian region of Aosta Valley.

The pass is located on the border at the southern tip of the Arolla Glacier, south of Mont Collon.

See also
 List of mountain passes

References
Swisstopo maps

Mountain passes of Valais
Mountain passes of Italy
Mountain passes of the Alps
Italy–Switzerland border crossings